Dan Rea is the conservative-leaning host of "NightSide with Dan Rea" WBZ radio, following the death of Paul Sullivan.

Education and background
A graduate of Boston Latin School (Class of 1966), Boston State College (English major) and Boston University School of Law, Rea is a native Bostonian who now lives in Newton, Massachusetts.  He was born at Faulkner Hospital and grew up in Readville.

Career
Prior to his current job on WBZ Radio, Dan Rea worked as a news reporter from 1976 to 2007 on WBZ's sister station, WBZ-TV, the CBS affiliate in Boston where he won two Regional Emmys and nine Regional Emmy Nominations.  He also had a small role in the movie Reversal of Fortune. His present radio career is a return to WBZ Radio since he was on air there while at Boston University School of Law in the 70s.  At that time, Rea was a conservative activist "...serving as national vice chairman of Young Americans for Freedom and opposing Richard Nixon’s re-election as president in 1972 on the grounds that he was too liberal." More recently, Rea has described his views as being libertarian conservative.

Awards
Rea spent four years trying to clear the name of Joe Salvati, a man who was wrongfully convicted of murder. Rea was able to find evidence that exonerated Mr. Salvati's name and he was released from prison.  For his work on the case, " the Massachusetts Bar Association honored Rea with the First Annual Excellence in Journalism Award. The Massachusetts Criminal Defense Lawyers Association for his efforts in the Salvati case also honored Rea."

In June 1988 Rea was presented with Boston University Law School's prestigious "Silver Shingle" award for outstanding public service."

In November of 2010, Rea received the "Yankee Quill Award by the Academy of New England Journalists and the New England Society of Newspaper Editors. This distinguished award is considered to be the highest individual honor awarded by fellow journalists in New England."

Family
Rea and his wife Jeanne, are parents of Daniel III and Catherine Florence. Daniel Rea III is the general manager of the Worcester Red Sox.

References

External links
Justice Finally Prevails for Joe Salvati

Boston University School of Law alumni
University of Massachusetts Boston alumni
American male journalists
American talk radio hosts
Year of birth missing (living people)
Living people
Boston State College alumni
Radio personalities from Boston
Boston Latin School alumni
People from Newton, Massachusetts
American television reporters and correspondents